Mid City is an unincorporated community in Pemiscot County, in the U.S. state of Missouri.

Mid City was so named on account of its midway location between Caruthersville and Kennett.

References

Unincorporated communities in Pemiscot County, Missouri
Unincorporated communities in Missouri